Delphinella polyspora is a species of fungus in the family Dothioraceae. It is known to grow on the pedicels and fruit of Kalmia procumbens and on Rhododendron indicum.

References

External links

Fungi described in 1962
Fungi of Argentina
Fungi of Brazil
Fungi of Iceland
Dothideales